A small number of cities and municipalities in Serbia held local elections in 2018. These were not part of the country's regular cycle of local elections but instead took place in certain jurisdictions where either the local government had fallen or the last local elections for four-year terms had taken place in 2014.

All local elections in Serbia in 2018 were held under proportional representation. Mayors were not directly elected but were instead chosen by elected members of the local assemblies. Parties were required to cross a five per cent electoral threshold (of all votes, not only of valid votes), although this requirement was waived for parties representing national minority communities.

Results

Belgrade

City of Belgrade
See: 2018 Belgrade City Assembly election

Vojvodina

Kula
An election was held in Kula on 16 December 2018. The municipality's mayor Velibor Milojičić had resigned in September 2018, at which time he was appointed leader of a provisional administration.

Damjan Miljanić of the Progressive Party was appointed as mayor after the election. He resigned in January 2022 in order to harmonize that year's scheduled municipal election with the 2022 Serbian general election and was appointed as leader of a provisional authority.

Šumadija and Western Serbia

Aranđelovac
An election was held in Aranđelovac on 5 March 2018, due to the expiry of the term of the previous assembly election in 2014.

Incumbent mayor Bojan Radović of the Progressive Party was confirmed for another term in office after the election.

Lučani
An election was held in Lučani on 16 December 2018, due to the expiry of the term of the previous assembly elected in 2014. Several opposition parties that chose to boycott other local elections held in late 2018 nonetheless participated in the Lučani vote.

Milivoje Dolović of the Serbian Progressive Party was chosen as mayor in January 2019. He resigned in January 2022, as a means of harmonizing the municipality's schedule for the 2022 local election with the 2022 Serbian general election and was appointed as leader of a provisional administration.

Užice: Sevojno
An election was held for the Municipal Assembly of Sevojno (in the city of Užice) on 3 April 2018, due to the expiry of the term of the previous assembly elected in 2014.

Ivan Marić of the Serbian Progressive Party was chosen as mayor after the election.

Southern and Eastern Serbia

Doljevac
Doljevac had a municipal election on 16 December 2018. The vote was precipitated by the resignation of the municipality's mayor, Goran Ljubić of the Progressive Party, on the grounds that he objected to the constant criticisms of Nenad Stojiljković (Dveri), the only opposition member of the previous assembly, and wanted to test the mood of the electorate. The election was boycotted by opposition parties and was criticized by some as a waste of money. Ljubić served as the leader of Doljevac's provisional government in 2018–19, before a new administration was established.

The results of the election were as follows:

Goran Ljubić was confirmed for a new term as mayor when the assembly convened in January 2019. He resigned in January 2022 in order to harmonize that year's municipal election with the 2022 Serbian general election and was appointed as leader of an interim administration.

Smederevska Palanka
The local assembly of Smederevska Palanka was dissolved in November 2017 for failing to meet within the legally designated time. Nikola Vučen of the Serbian Progressive Party was appointed as the leader of a provisional authority pending new elections, which took place on 25 March 2018.

The results of the election were as follows:

Nikola Vučen was confirmed as mayor after the election.

References

Local elections in Serbia
Loc